Apimondia or International Federation of Beekeepers' Associations promotes scientific, ecological, social and economic apicultural development in all countries and the cooperation of beekeepers` associations, scientific bodies and of individuals involved in apiculture worldwide. The name Apimondia is a compound word made from two words; api, referring to honey bees, and mondia, referring to the world.

The federation issues a journal, Apiacta. The 2003 and 2004 issues are available online free of charge.

Since 1897, every other year Apimondia organizes beekeepers' congresses, hosted by different countries.

Apimondia maintains seven scientific commissions and five regional commissions for the purposes of furthering scientific understanding of apiculture and to facilitate exchange of information.

The scientific commissions include:
 Beekeeping Economy
 Bee Health
 Bee Biology
 Pollination and Bee Flora
 Beekeeping Technology and Quality
 Apitherapy
 Beekeeping for Rural Development



List of congresses

References

External links 
APIMONDIA Home page

Beekeeping organizations
International organisations based in Italy
Agricultural organisations based in Italy